Marcus Tuttle (10 May 1830 – 8 January 1884) was an American politician.

Marcus Tuttle was the son of Ira Tuttle and Lucy Brockett, born on 10 May 1830 in Fairfield, New York. Tuttle attended school in Clinton, Oneida County, New York, where his family had relocated in 1842. Tuttle moved west with his brothers to Des Moines, Iowa, then aided the platting of Clear Lake, Iowa. He became a realtor, shopkeeper, and banker for the community. Tuttle was a Republican. He served one term as Cerro Gordo County judge, and was subsequently named an internal revenue assessor for Cerro Gordo and three neighboring counties. Tuttle resigned from the assessor post upon his election to the Iowa Senate in 1867. He represented District 39. Two years later, Tuttle was redistricted, and completed his term as a state senator representing District 46. In 1879, Tuttle moved to Spencer. He died of tuberculosis on 8 January 1884.

References

People from Clinton, Oneida County, New York
People from Fairfield, New York
American real estate businesspeople
1830 births
Businesspeople from Iowa
Infectious disease deaths in Iowa
19th-century deaths from tuberculosis
American bankers
19th-century American businesspeople
County judges in the United States
County officials in Iowa
1884 deaths
19th-century American politicians
People from Clear Lake, Iowa
People from Spencer, Iowa
Republican Party Iowa state senators
Tuberculosis deaths in Iowa